Vedas Venkaiah (Telugu:వెదస్ వెంకయ్య)(born 2 March 1941) is an Indian politician and former Member of Legislative Assembly (MLA) for Suryapet Assembly Constituency under the Indian National Congress party between 2004 and 2009.

Early life 

Vedas Venkaiah was born on 2 March 1941 in Kudakuda, Suryapet. He completed his M.A.,LL.B. in 1967–70 at Osmania University, Hyderabad. He worked and retired as Assistant Commissioner of Commercial Tax. He belongs to a scheduled caste.

References 

People from Suryapet
Telugu politicians
Members of the Andhra Pradesh Legislative Assembly
Indian National Congress politicians from Telangana
Living people
1941 births
Indian National Congress politicians from Andhra Pradesh